Olena Ivanivna Olefirenko (born 11 April 1978 in Novoyavorivsk, Lviv Oblast) is a Ukrainian rower.  At the 2004 Olympics she was disqualified with her team when she was tested positive for ethamivan.

References 
 
 

1978 births
Living people
Ukrainian female rowers
People from Novoyavorivsk
Olympic rowers of Ukraine
Rowers at the 2004 Summer Olympics
Rowers at the 2008 Summer Olympics
Competitors stripped of Summer Olympics medals
Doping cases in rowing
Ukrainian sportspeople in doping cases
European Rowing Championships medalists
Sportspeople from Lviv Oblast